Marcel Vos is a Dutch RollerCoaster Tycoon analyst and YouTuber. Vos is known for creating in-depth videos on the technical mechanics of OpenRCT2 and its predecessors.

Work 
In July 2018, Vos released a video demonstrating a calculator created using roller coasters within RollerCoaster Tycoon 2.
In December 2018, Vos demonstrated a ride which would take 12 real-life years to complete. In July 2019, he released a video demonstrating a ride that would take 45 real-life years to complete. In December 2019, Vos demonstrated a roller coaster that would take 135 years to complete.

In July 2020, Vos demonstrated a maze that exploits the path-finding algorithm in RollerCoaster Tycoon 2 and is nearly impossible for in-game guests to complete. After releasing his video on YouTube, the developers of OpenRCT2 changed the algorithm.

References 

Dutch YouTubers
Year of birth missing (living people)
Gaming YouTubers